Foyle is a parliamentary constituency in the House of Commons of the United Kingdom. The current MP is Colum Eastwood of the SDLP.

Constituency profile
The name comes from the River Foyle which the city lies on and is used to avoid the contentious names of Derry or Londonderry, as well as to cover the areas of County Tyrone that were originally in the constituency. The seat is nationalist-leaning and residents' wealth is below average for the UK.

The wards within the constituency are among the poorest in the UK with high unemployment, high welfare dependency and the lowest employment rate for Northern Ireland.

The seat has typically been an SDLP stronghold however in 2017 Sinn Féin gained the seat for the first time the smallest majority in Northern Ireland of 169. In 2019 SDLP leader Colum Eastwood won the seat back with an 18% swing and 17,000 majority.

Boundaries

The seat was created in boundary changes in 1983, as part of an expansion of Northern Ireland's constituencies from 12 to 17, and was predominantly made up from the old Londonderry constituency. From further revisions in 1995 (when it lost parts of the district of Strabane to the West Tyrone constituency), and until the 2008 revision, it covered exactly the same area as Derry City Council.

Prior to the 2010 general election the transfer of Claudy and Banagher wards to East Londonderry were approved through the passing of the Northern Ireland Parliamentary Constituencies Order in 2008.

History

At the seat's creation at the 1983 general election, SDLP leader John Hume won the new seat, becoming the party's only MP after it lost Belfast West to Sinn Féin.  Hume retained the seat until his retirement at the 2005 general election, when he was succeeded by the SDLP's Mark Durkan.

Durkan retained the seat in 2010. This seat also gave the Alliance Party their worst share of the vote in Northern Ireland, polling just 0.6% of the votes.  Durkan was re-elected to a third term in 2015, increasing his share of the vote to 47.9% and winning a majority of 6,046 votes.

In the 2016 referendum to leave the European Union, the constituency was estimated to have voted remain by 78.3%. This was the sixth highest support for remain for a constituency, and the highest support for remain in Northern Ireland.

In the 2017 election, the seat was won by Elisha McCallion of Sinn Féin, who won with a majority of just 169 votes over Mark Durkan. Following the election, concerns about electoral malpractice were raised with the Electoral Office by the SDLP and People Before Profit's Eamonn McCann.

In the 2019 election, the seat was recaptured by SDLP leader Colum Eastwood. Sinn Féin's vote share dropped significantly from 39.7% in 2017 to 20.7% in 2019, which was the lowest percentage share that that party had won in any general election in the constituency since 1992.

Members of Parliament 
The Member of Parliament since the 2019 UK General Election is Colum Eastwood of the SDLP. He succeeded Elisha McCallion of  Sinn Féin to regain the seat which the SDLP had held from its 1983 creation until 2017. The constituency was previously represented by John Hume, former leader of the SDLP and recipient of the Nobel Peace Prize.

Elections

Elections in the 2010s 

This seat saw the largest decrease in vote share for Sinn Féin at the 2019 general election.

Elections in the 2000s

Elections in the 1990s

Elections in the 1980s

See also
 Foyle and City of Londonderry were neighbouring constituencies in the Northern Ireland Parliament from 1929 to 1973.
 Londonderry City was a borough constituency in the UK parliament from the Act of Union to 1922.

External links 
2017 Election House Of Commons Library 2017 Election report
A Vision Of Britain Through Time (Constituency elector numbers)

References

Westminster Parliamentary constituencies in Northern Ireland
Constituencies of the Parliament of the United Kingdom established in 1983
Politics of Derry (city)